The Igushik River (Yup'ik: Iiyuussiiq) is a stream,  long, in the southwestern part of the U.S. state of Alaska. The river flows south from Amanka Lake into the Nushagak Bay arm of Bristol Bay. Except for a small segment in the village of Manokotak, the entire river is part of the Togiak National Wildlife Refuge.

See also
List of rivers of Alaska

References

Rivers of Dillingham Census Area, Alaska
Rivers of Alaska
Rivers of Unorganized Borough, Alaska